Ador Gjuci (born 29 January 1998) is an Italian-born Albanian footballer who plays as a left-winger for Matera Calcio in Serie D. His family is originally from Burrel, Albania.

Club career

Early career
Gjuci was born in Aversa, Campania, Italy to Albanian parents from Burrel. He grow up as a player at Sassoferrato Genga from where he was signed by Reggina.

He made it his debut for Reggina at the age of 16 and 8 months during a derby match on 5 October 2014 against Cosenza which was won 3–0 by Reggina, becoming the third youngest debutant in the Reggina's history after Vincenzo Camilleri and Giandomenico Mesto. After Roberto Insigne scored his third personal goal and third goal of the match even, the coach Francesco Cozza decided to give Gjuci the great opportunity to make it his first professional debut.

On 6 January 2015 he managed to score his first professional goal against Martina Franca after playing as a starter and scored in the 25th minute also to give his side the 1–0 victory.

Monterosi
On 13 November 2018, he joined Monterosi in Serie D.

Fano
On 14 August 2019, he returned to Serie C, signing a one-year contract with Fano. On 3 January 2020, his Fano contract was terminated by mutual consent.

International career
In an interview after his debut in Reggina, Gjuci admitted that he wanted to play for Albania at international level and would welcome an invitation by FSHF.

He received his first call up at the Albania national under-19 football team by the coach Arjan Bellaj for a 7 days gathering in Durrës, Albania from 29 August to 5 September 2015.

Career statistics

Club

References

External links
La scheda di Ador Gjuci TuttoREGGINA

1998 births
Living people
People from Aversa
Italian people of Albanian descent
Association football wingers
Albanian footballers
Italian footballers
Torino F.C. players
Reggina 1914 players
S.S. Akragas Città dei Templi players
Alma Juventus Fano 1906 players
S.E.F. Torres 1903 players
Serie C players
Serie D players
Footballers from Campania
Sportspeople from the Province of Caserta